Bogdan Tudor (born 1 February 1970) is a Romanian long jumper, best known for his bronze medal at the 1994 European Indoor Championships. His personal best and Romanian record is 8.37 metres, achieved in July 1995 in Bad Cannstatt. He has the indoor world record at +35 years category with 7.98 meters, achieved in February 2005.

Achievements

References

External links

1970 births
Living people
Romanian male long jumpers
Athletes (track and field) at the 1992 Summer Olympics
Athletes (track and field) at the 1996 Summer Olympics
Olympic athletes of Romania
Sportspeople from Bucharest
World Athletics Championships athletes for Romania
Universiade medalists in athletics (track and field)
Russian masters athletes
Universiade bronze medalists for Romania
Medalists at the 1991 Summer Universiade